Finding Moon is a novel written in 1996 by Tony Hillerman, set in Southeast Asia.

Plot 

During the weeks immediately preceding to the 1975 Fall of Saigon that ended the Vietnam War, Malcolm "Moon" Thomas Mathias, manages the Press-Register, a small Colorado newspaper. He had always believed that his brother Ricky was the favorite child of their mother Victoria Mathias Morick. Ricky had been running a helicopter business in the Indochina peninsula, and married to a Vietnamese woman named Eleth Vinh. Both were killed by enemy fire, leaving behind young daughter Lila Vinh Mathias. 

The first that the family learns of the existence of Lila is in a letter to Victoria from Ricky's attorney Roberto Bolivar Castenada in Manila, the Philippines. Victoria immediately books a flight to Manila to retrieve her grandchild, only to be stopped by a heart attack at Los Angeles International Airport. After receiving an emergency call from Philippine Airlines, Moon learns his mother is facing immediate heart surgery at Cedars-Sinai Medical Center. Moon was unaware that he had a niece, much less that his mother was en route to the Philippines. He learns the details going through her belongings while awaiting visitation at the hospital.  After talking to her, Moon takes his mother's place to find Lila.

Upon Moon's arrival in Manila, he is approached by two of Ricky's clients. The elderly Lum Lee asks Moon to help him find a family urn containing ancestral bones.  Mrs. Osa van Winjgaarden wants to accompany Moon on his quest, so that she may find her brother, a Lutheran missionary known as Brother Damon. With each new contact, Moon gradually learns more about his brother's business and associates. The quest takes him on a search through his own soul, as he engages in long talks with Father Julian in the confessional of the Manila Cathedral. Romance, political intrigue, the dangers of traveling through war zones, and hiding in the basement of a deserted building, are part of the action. Among the new, sometimes uneasy, alliances that he makes, is Nguyen Nung, a wounded ARVN deserter armed with a grenade launcher, and "SAT CONG" ("kill Viet Cong") tattooed on his chest.

Characters

Stateside

The Mathias family
Malcolm "Moon" Thomas Mathias – managing editor Press-Register, served in the armored division of the U. S. Army
Richard "Ricky" Mathias – Moon's brother, founder of R. M. Air in Vietnam; died in Cambodia
Martin Mathias – deceased father
Victoria Mathias Morick – mother
Dr. Tom Morick – Victoria's 2nd husband, and doctor to Martin Mathias.

Press-Register newspaper, Colorado
Jerry Shakeshaft – publisher
JD Shakeshaft – son of the publisher
Rooney – featured articles, city desk
Shirley – switchboard, office manager
D. W. Hubble
Edith – payroll

Other
Sgt. Gene Halsey – Moon's best friend in the Army, at Fort Riley, Kansas; died in a jeep accident, caused by Moon's driving while intoxicated
Dr. Serna – Victoria's doctor at Cedars-Sinai Medical Center in Los Angeles
Dr. Jerrigan –  ER doctor who saved Victoria's life 
Robert Toland – Philippine Airlines security officer at LAX
Debbie – Moon's live-in girlfriend

Asia
Eleth Vinh – wife of Ricky Mathias
Lila Vinh Mathias – daughter of Eleth and Ricky
Roberto Bolivar Castenada – Manila attorney for Ricky
Lum Lee – seeking a family urn containing ancestral bones
Mrs. Osa van Winjgaarden – wants Moon to find her brother
Reverend Damon – Osa's Lutheran missionary brother in Cambodia

R. M. Air

Incorporated in the Philippines, operating in Vietnam and Cambodia
Thomas "Tommy" Brock – marketing manager, was supposed to get Lila on a flight to the United States
George Rice – pilot who flew Lila to Saigon; also worked for the CIA; made arrangements for Lila to be transported to the United States.
Robert Yager – chief pilot and deal maker for R.M. Air
Pol Thiu Eng – employee who found Ricky's helicopter wreckage

Other
Captain Teele – Glory of the Sea schooner
Mr. Suhuannaphum – shore boat pilot who helps repair the schooner
Nguyen Nung –  rescued wounded sailor from the LST Sealord 
Lo Tho Dem – George Rice contact in Saigon
Father Julian – Manila Cathedral

Reception 

Reviews on Goodreads were divided. With a rating of 1 to 5 stars:
24% gave it a 5-star rating - "Hillerman is remarkable in his grasp of the politics and history of the time..."  
39%, the majority. gave it a 4-star rating - "The locations he visits and the people he meets are all vividly painted by Hillerman as beautifully as in his Navajo mysteries."
28% gave it a 3-star rating - "I found it predictable ... "
5% gave it a 2-star rating - " ... slow moving and a little boring at times."
4% gave it a 1-star rating - "Slow and not a good book at all."

On Amazon, the majority of reviewers rated the book 5 stars out of a possible 5.  Reviewers who were military veterans having previously served in Southeast Asia during the Vietnam War, lauded Hillerman for his authenticity. One reviewer suggested that the events in the book are mirrored by current conflicts in the Middle East. Some less enthusiastic readers felt the book was bogged down in details, or otherwise not up to Hillerman's style in the Joe Leaphorn / Jim Chee Navajo Tribal Police novels.

Publishers Weekly stated, "Hillerman's mastery of setting and his compassionate, patient characterization are fully present in this tale, which is otherwise somewhat formulaic."

References

Further reading 

1996 American novels
Novels by Tony Hillerman
Novels set in Cambodia
HarperCollins books